The 18A was a 2013 Argentine protest demonstration.

18A, 18-A, 18a or XVIII-A may also refer to:

 Air & Space 18A, a 1965 United States gyroplane
 Highway 18A (Ontario)
 Nevada State Route 18A
 Soyuz 18a, a 1975 Soviet spacecraft mission
 Stalag XVIII-A, a German prisoner of war camp
 Volkswagen Type 18A, a 1949 special version made for the German police